Jack Shea may refer to:

 Jack Shea (speed skater) (1910–2002), American speed skater
 Jack Shea (footballer) (1927–1983), Australian rules footballer
 Jack Shea (director) (1928–2013), American film and television director